Blue Max is an informal name of Pour le Mérite, a German military decoration from 1740 until the end of World War I.

Blue Max may also refer to:
 Blue Max (video game) (1983) and its sequel Blue Max 2001
 Blue Max (board game) (1983)
 The Blue Max, a 1966 film
 2d Battalion, 20th Field Artillery (United States), known as "Blue Max" during the Vietnam War
 Blue Max, one of protagonists in the video game Sky Kid
 Blue Max, the band of American guitarist Howard Luedtke
 Blue Max, a fictional character from The Han Solo Adventures novels